

Piccadilly Valley wine sub-region is a wine sub-region in South Australia located between the towns of Ashton and Basket Range in the north and the towns of Stirling, Aldgate and Bridgewater to its south in the Mount Lofty Ranges to the east of the Adelaide city centre.  The sub-region received appellation as an Australian Geographical Indication (AGI) on 14 April 2000.  The sub-region is part of the Adelaide Hills wine region and the Mount Lofty Ranges zone.

See also

South Australian wine

Citations and references

Citations

References

Wine regions of South Australia